Rebecca Goring (born 9 June 1994) is an Australian rules footballer who played for the Geelong Football Club in the AFL Women's competition (AFLW).

AFL Women's career 
Goring was signed by Geelong prior to the 2018 AFL Women's draft under the league's expansion club signing rules. She had previously played for and captained Geelong's side in the lower-tier VFL Women's competition in 2017 and 2018. As the club's vice-captain, Goring served as captain during that match, in the absence of injured club captain Melissa Hickey. In June 2021, she was delisted by Geelong.

Personal life 
Goring grew up in Geelong, Victoria, before graduating from the Melbourne Conservatorium of Music in 2016, having studied jazz and improvisation. Whilst studying, she also played football for Melbourne University Football Club. Goring is a guitarist and singer-songwriter who has performed both as a solo artist and in various bands. Additionally, she is the director of the Sweethearts Junior Academy, a music group based in Geelong for young girls.

References

External links 

1994 births
Living people
Geelong Football Club (AFLW) players
Australian rules footballers from Victoria (Australia)
Sportswomen from Victoria (Australia)
Melbourne University Football Club (VFLW) players